Carrington is a small suburb of Nottingham, England, located approximately  north of Nottingham city centre. It lies next to the areas of Sherwood, Mapperley, Forest Fields, Basford, Sherwood Rise and the Forest Recreation Ground.

Amenities
Owing to its proximity to the city centre, Carrington has a number of hotels and guest houses along its two main roads, (A60 - Mansfield Road and A611 - Hucknall Road) and hosts a varied selection of local shops and small businesses which also serve the community of Mapperley Park. Carrington is also home to Carrington Primary School rated as a Good School by Ofsted in 2013.

History
In the early part of the twentieth century, horse-drawn trams ran along Mansfield Road to the stables and depot between St. John's Church and Watcombe Road. Later, this line was extended to Sherwood and upgraded to electric trams. The tram depot was replaced by Carrington Lido (open air swimming pool) and, later still, by a town-house development.

The 2418 (Sherwood) Squadron of the Air Training Corps is located in Wesley Street.

Recent years have seen the construction of a Lidl supermarket on Mansfield Road.

Notable people 
Anthony Clarke Booth (1846–1899), recipient of the Victoria Cross for service during the Anglo-Zulu War
Chris Staniforth (1895–1954), footballer for Mansfield Town, Notts County and Oldham Athletic

Politics
Carrington lies within the Nottingham City Council Sherwood ward, which has three Labour Party councillors. It lies in the Nottingham East constituency and has been represented by Labour Party MP Nadia Whittome since 2019.

See also
Church of St. John the Evangelist, Carrington
Nottingham and District Tramways Company Limited
Nottingham Corporation Tramways
Miss Cullen's Almshouses

References

External links
Carrington Lido image from the 1950s.

Areas of Nottingham